Sam Jaffe (May 21, 1901 – January 10, 2000) was, at different points in his career in the motion picture industry, an agent, a producer and a studio executive.

Biography
Jaffe was born in the Harlem neighborhood of New York City, to Russian-Jewish immigrants, the son of Hannah and Max Jaffe. He had three older siblings: brothers, Joseph and David, and sister Adeline. He was raised on the Lower East Side of Manhattan.

After dropping out of DeWitt Clinton High School, he took a job as an office boy for the Famous Players-Lasky Corporation where his brother-in-law, B.P. Schulberg, was an executive. He eventually worked his way up through the ranks to become the executive in charge of production including films directed by Ernst Lubitsch, Josef von Sternberg and Rouben Mamoulian. In 1932, he was released from Paramount over internal politics and then worked briefly for Harry Cohn at Columbia Pictures before joining the Schulberg-Feldman agency co-founded by his older sister Adeline Schulberg with Charles K. Feldman. In 1933, his sister left the firm to form the Ad Schulberg agency after her divorce from B.P. Schulberg; the firm represented the likes of Marlene Dietrich, Fredric March, and Herbert Marshall before she sold it and moved to London. In 1935, Jaffe opened his own talent agency named the Jaffe Agency. While running the agency, he was able to convince 20th Century Fox head Darryl F. Zanuck to let him produce The Fighting Sullivans in 1944. He successfully represented several stars and directors of the era, including Humphrey Bogart, Fritz Lang, Raoul Walsh, Stanley Kubrick, Lauren Bacall, David Niven, Zero Mostel, Richard Burton, Mary Astor, Barbara Stanwyck, Lee J. Cobb, and Jennifer Jones. In the late 1940s, his business was negatively affected by the investigations of many of his clients by the House Un-American Activities Committee investigations into Hollywood. In 1949, he sold the Jaffe Agency to his brother-in-law, Phil Gersh.

In 1959, he retired and moved to London where he produced several films including Born Free in 1966 and Theater of Blood in 1973. In 1985, he returned to Los Angeles where he became a collector of modern art.

Personal life
Jaffe was married to Mildred Gersh, sister of Hollywood agent, Phil Gersh, who would later purchase the Jaffe Agency in 1949 which he renamed The Gersh Agency in the 1960s. He had three daughters: Naomi Jaffe Carroll, Barbara Jaffe Kohn, and Judith Jaffe Tolmach Silber. His daughter Barbara was married to producer John Kohn. His grandson is Matt Tolmach, co-president of production at Sony Pictures Entertainment. Another grandson is director Peter Kohn (director) (formerly married to English actress Amanda Pays).

Partial filmography
Theater of Blood (1973)
Born Free (1966)
Damian and Pythias (1962)
The Fighting Sullivans (1944)
Diplomaniacs (1933)
The Vanishing Frontier (1932)

References

External links

Film producers from New York (state)
Jewish American film producers
American talent agents
American people of Russian-Jewish descent
1901 births
2000 deaths
20th-century American businesspeople
DeWitt Clinton High School alumni
Jaffe family